Hours of Work (Coal Mines) Convention, 1931 was  an International Labour Organization Convention.

It was established in 1931:
Having decided upon the adoption of certain proposals with regard to hours of work in coal mines,...

The convention was never brought into force.

Revision 
The principles of the convention were subsequently revised by ILO Convention C46.

Withdrawn
The convention was never brought into force, and it was withdrawn May 30, 2000 at the ILO General Conference.

External links 
Text.
Ratifications.

International Labour Organization conventions
Working time
Treaties concluded in 1931
History of coal mining
Treaties not entered into force
Mining treaties
1931 in labor relations